"Stay", also known as "Stay - ČIŪTO TŪTO", is a song by Lithuanian singer Monika Linkytė, officially released on 14 February 2023. The song is set to represent Lithuania in the Eurovision Song Contest 2023 after winning .

Background and composition 
In press statements given out to Lithuanian National Radio and Television (LRT), Monika reported that she, along with Latvian songwriter Chris Noah, had written "Stay" during an unplanned writing session. According to Monika, she wanted to write about "how important it is to pause and come back to yourself." Some lines in the song relate to Lithuanian folk sutras, speaking about a yearning for hearing the voice of "our heart more and more."

Eurovision Song Contest

("Let's try again! 2023") is the national final format developed by LRT in order to select Lithuania's entry for the Eurovision Song Contest 2023. For the 2023 competition, two heats consisting of fifteen entries each were held on 21 and 28, January where five entries from each heat were eliminated, while the remaining twenty entries participated in the competition's two semi-finals, taking place on 4 and 11 February. In each semi-final, ten entries participated and the top five proceeded to the final. In the final, the winner would be selected from the remaining ten entries. The results of each of the six shows were determined by the 50/50 combination of votes from a jury panel and public televoting.

"Stay" was chosen to compete in the second heat, qualifying by finishing second out of 15 entries in the heat. In the second semi-final, the song performed fifth, finishing third, and qualifying for the grand final of the contest. In the final, the song received 12 points from the juries and 10 points from televoting, earning a total of 22 points. The song tied with Rūta Mur's song "So Low"; however, as "Stay" managed to earn a higher jury score, it won the competition and the Lithuanian spot for the Eurovision Song Contest 2023.

At Eurovision 
According to Eurovision rules, all nations with the exceptions of the host country and the "Big Five" (France, Germany, Italy, Spain and the United Kingdom) are required to qualify from one of two semi-finals in order to compete for the final; the top ten countries from each semi-final progress to the final. The European Broadcasting Union (EBU) split up the competing countries into six different pots based on voting patterns from previous contests, with countries with favourable voting histories put into the same pot. On 31 January 2023, an allocation draw was held, which placed each country into one of the two semi-finals, and determined which half of the show they would perform in. Lithuania has been placed into the second semi-final, to be held on 11 May 2023, and has been scheduled to perform in the second half of the show.

Charts

References 

2023 songs
2023 singles
Eurovision songs of 2023
Eurovision songs of Lithuania